Adapur is a block in East Champaran district of Bihar, India. Adapur is located on the India - Nepal border. There are many villagers Near Adapur town peoples come to buy their daily essential things.

Transportation 

Adapur is well connected to the major towns of Bihar by road  and rail. Raxaul is the near major junction to connect metro cities Delhi, Mumbai, Kolkata and Hyderabad, by rail. Currently local trans only stop here towards Raxaul- Narkatiaganj and Sitamarhi- Darbhanga route.

Air
Another airport at Raxaul Airport,  about 13 km away, is drafted to be operational in future. Jay Prakash Narayan International Airport  Patna is the operational Airport.

Rail
Adapur is a railway station on the Broad gauge Raxaul-Darbhanga line. Presently, the rail lines are without overhead Electric wires i.e. only Diesel engines can be run on them.

Road
The town is well connected via canal road. People can reach to district headquarter Motihari  and Raxaul.

School

Bansi Dhar High School is a government high school.

Administration:

Adapur block situated in the town to provide the government facilities to peoples.

Banks

There are some government banks  available here in town including State Bank of India, Central Bank of India, United Bank of India and Gramin bank

India-Nepal border crossing 

At present people cross vehicles cross India-Nepal border at Inarwa Beldarwa village. A check post will be constructed there soon.

References

East Champaran district